Alfred Edward Ackroyd (14 January 1885 – 21 May 1952) was a New Zealand cricketer. He played first-class cricket for Otago and Canterbury between 1906/07 and 1907/08. Outside of cricket he worked as a warehouseman.

References

External links
 

1885 births
1952 deaths
New Zealand cricketers
Canterbury cricketers
Otago cricketers
Cricketers from Dunedin